Furness is a peninsula in the southern part of Cumbria, in north-west England.

Furness may also refer to:
 Furness Abbey, a former monastery in Barrow-in-Furness, Cumbria
 Furness Building Society, a British building society
 Furness Church, a church in County Kildare, Ireland
 Furness College, Barrow-in-Furness, A college of further education situated in Barrow-in-Furness, Cumbria
 Furness College, Lancaster, A constituent college of Lancaster University, named after the Furness area
 Furness Fells, a multitude of hills and mountains in Furness
 Furness line, a railway in North West England
 Furness Railway, a former railway company operating in Furness
 Furness Vale, a village in High Peak, Derbyshire, England
 Silurus furness, a species of fish
 Viscount Furness, a former title in the Peerage of the United Kingdom

People with the surname Furness:

 Betty Furness (1916–1994), American actress, consumer advocate and current affairs commentator
 Bruce Furness (21st century), former mayor of Fargo, North Dakota
 Caroline Furness (1869–1936), American astronomer
 Christopher Furness, 1st Baron Furness (1852–1912), British businessman and Liberal politician
 Christopher Furness (VC) (1912–1940), English recipient of the Victoria Cross
 Deborra-Lee Furness (born 1955), Australian actress, director and producer
 Don Furness (Australian rules footballer) (born 1930), former Australian rules footballer
 Don Furness (rugby union) (1921–1993), former rugby union player
 Ed Furness (1911–2005), Canadian comic book artist
 Frank Furness (1839–1912), American architect
 George Furness (1820–1900), British construction engineer
 Harold Furness (1887–1975), American cricketer
 Horace Howard Furness (1833–1912), American Shakespearean scholar
 Rachel Furness (born 1988), Northern Irish association footballer
 Richard Furness (1791–1857), British poet
 Steve Furness (1950–2000), American football defensive tackle
 Thelma Furness, Viscountess Furness (1904–1970), American socialite
 Vera Furness (1921–2002), English chemist and industrial manager
 William Anthony Furness, 2nd Viscount Furness (1929–1995), Viscount in the Peerage of the United Kingdom
 William Henry Furness (1802–1896), American abolitionist and Unitarian minister
 Annis Lee Wister (née Furness, 1830–1908), American translator
 Caroline Furness Jayne (née Furness, 1873–1909), American ethnologist

See also
 Furnace (disambiguation)
 Furnes (disambiguation)